HMS Modeste was a 64-gun third rate ship of the line of the Royal Navy. She was previously the 64-gun Modeste, of the French Navy, launched in 1759 and captured later that year.

French career and capture
Modeste was laid down at Toulon in April 1756 to a design by Noël Pomet, and was launched on 12 February 1759. Work on her was completed by May 1759, and she joined Chef d'escadre Jean-François de La Clue-Sabran's fleet in the port. The Seven Years' War was being fought at the time, and the Toulon fleet was being blockaded by Admiral Edward Boscawen. Taking advantage of the British fleet's departure for supplies, the French left port and sailed into the Atlantic. There they were chased and finally brought to battle by Boscawen off Lagos, Portugal. The ensuing Battle of Lagos, fought between 18 and 19 August 1759, saw the defeat of the French fleet, with two of their ships destroyed and three taken. Captured alongside Modeste were the 74-gun ships Téméraire and Centaure.

Taken as a prize into Portsmouth, she was surveyed there that December, and was purchased for the navy on 7 January 1760 for the sum of £17,068.18.1. She was named HMS Modeste, retaining her French name, on 11 January and was added to the navy lists. Having been commissioned into the navy, she underwent a refit in June and July 1760.

British career
Modeste was commissioned under her first commander, Captain Henry Speke, in April 1760, though command soon passed to Captain Robert Walsingham. Modeste then sailed to the Leeward Islands in October 1761 and was present at the reduction of Martinique in January and February 1762. Captain John Hollwall took command later that year and Modeste remained in the Leeward Islands until returning to Britain to be paid off in March 1764.

She spent the next few years laid up, being occasionally surveyed and repaired as required. She was fitted out at Portsmouth in early 1771 and was recommissioned as a guard ship under Captain John Wheelock. She went out to Jamaica in June 1771, but returned to Britain to be paid off in October 1772.  She was fitted out for her final role, a receiving ship at Portsmouth, between July and August 1778. She saw out the rest of the American War of Independence and most of the French Revolutionary Wars in this state, until finally being broken up at Portsmouth in August 1800.

Notes

References

Lavery, Brian (2003) The Ship of the Line - Volume 1: The development of the battlefleet 1650-1850. Conway Maritime Press. .

Ships of the line of the French Navy
Ships of the line of the Royal Navy
1759 ships
Ships built in France
Captured ships
Vaillant-class ships of the line